Yugul or Yukul (Yukul) is an extinct Australian Aboriginal language of the Marran family. The name "Yugul" has been used in various ways by people of Ngukurr, where this language may have been spoken, including as a cover term for languages of the area. A summary of the available information on Yugul is presented in Baker (2010). However, on the basis of place names, Harvey (2008) notes that Yugul appears to be closely related to Marra.

References

Baker, Brett. 'Who were the "Yukul"? And who are they now?'. In Baker, Brett, Ilana Mushin, Mark Harvey & Rod Gardner (eds). Indigenous language and social identity: Papers in honour of Michael Walsh. Canberra: Pacific Linguistics. pp. 79-104.

Unattested languages of Australia